A list of films produced in Italy in 1945 (see 1945 in film):

References

Bibliography

External links
Italian films of 1945 at the Internet Movie Database

Italian
1945
Films